Stig Arne Tommy "Baloo" Berggren (20 April 1950 – 3 December 2012) was a Swedish footballer. Berggren played 13 seasons (291 games), and scored 55 goals for Djurgårdens IF. In 1978, Berggren was the top scorer in Allsvenskan, with a total of 19 goals. Berggren played first as a left back but was later converted to forward position.

Career statistics

Honours 

Djurgårdens IF
 Division 2 Norra: 1982
Individual
 Allsvenskan sop scorer: 1978

References 

1950 births
2012 deaths
Swedish footballers
Djurgårdens IF Fotboll players
Allsvenskan players
Footballers from Stockholm
Association football defenders
Association football forwards